was a Japanese physicist. He proposed the edge state that is unique to 
graphene zigzag edges. Also, he theoretically pointed out the importance and peculiarity of nanoscale and edge shape effects in nanographene. The theoretical concept of graphene nanoribbons was introduced by him and his research group to study the nanoscale effect of graphene. He was an associate professor at Tsukuba University, and died of a subarachnoid hemorrhage on March 18, 1998.

Awards
After his death, the original paper on graphene edge state and graphene nanoribbons was awarded the JPS Best Paper Award in March 2003 from the Physical Society of Japan.
JPS Best Paper award, Physical Society of Japan

Representative publications

See also
Graphite
Graphene oxide paper
Carbon nanotubes
Katsunori Wakabayashi

External links
 Google Scholar
Author Index All archive
Scientific Commons

1998 deaths
Japanese physicists
Japanese nanotechnologists
1959 births
Academic staff of the University of Tsukuba
Kyoto University alumni